Mandy Butcher (born November 28, 1986) is a Canadian actress. She is known for her roles in the television series Naturally, Sadie as Chelsea Breuer and in Monster Warriors as Tabby.

Butcher has a younger brother named Adam Butcher who is an actor.

Television
 Radio Free Roscoe (2004–2005) - Nicole (2 episodes)
 Naturally, Sadie (2005) - Chelsea Breuer (12 episodes)
 Monster Warriors (2006–2007) - Tabby (50 episodes)

Filmography
 Ice Princess (2005) - Mean Party Girl

External links

1986 births
Canadian film actresses
Canadian television actresses
Living people
Canadian child actresses
People from Cambridge, Ontario
Actresses from Ontario